Border Vigilantes is a 1941 American Western film directed by Derwin Abrahams and written by J. Benton Cheney. The film stars William Boyd, Russell Hayden, Andy Clyde, Frances Gifford, Victor Jory, Ethel Wales and Morris Ankrum. The film was released on April 18, 1941, by Paramount Pictures.

Border Vigilantes was the 34th entry in the Hopalong Cassidy western series, with 32 more still on the way.

Plot

Hopalong Cassidy (William Boyd), California Carlson (Andy Clyde) and Lucky Jenkins (Russell Hayden) ride into a town bedevilled by outlaw raids, despite the existence of a local vigilante committee. Sensing that something's wrong with this set-up, Hoppy does a bit of digging and discovers that the outlaw chieftain is the head of the vigilantes.

Cast 
 William Boyd as Hopalong Cassidy
 Russell Hayden as Lucky Jenkins
 Andy Clyde as California Carlson
 Frances Gifford as Helen Forbes
 Victor Jory as Henry Logan
 Ethel Wales as Aunt Jennifer Forbes
 Morris Ankrum as Dan Forbes
 Tom Tyler as Henchman Yager
 Hal Taliaferro as Henchman Big Ed Stone 
 Jack Rockwell as Hank Weaver
 Britt Wood as Lafe Willis

References

External links 
 
 
 
 
 List of Hopalong Cassidy films

1941 films
American black-and-white films
Paramount Pictures films
American Western (genre) films
1941 Western (genre) films
Hopalong Cassidy films
Films directed by Derwin Abrahams
1940s English-language films
1940s American films